The 2012 IIFA Awards, officially the 13th International Indian Film Academy Awards ceremony, presented by the International Indian Film Academy honouring the films of 2011 took place between 7–9 June 2012. The official ceremony took place on 9 June 2012, at the Singapore Indoor Stadium in Singapore for the second time after 2004. The ceremony was televised in India and internationally on Star Plus. Actors Shahid Kapoor and Farhan Akhtar co-hosted the ceremony the first time. The IIFA Red Carpet was hosted by Karan Tacker

In related events, IIFA Rocks, also known as the IIFA Music and Fashion Extravaganza took place on 8 June 2012 at the Esplanade Concert Hall. The event was hosted by Ayushmann Khurrana and Chitrangada Singh. During the event, all technical awards were presented to the winners. It was telecast on 1 & 7 July on popular Hindi Entertainment channel Star Plus.

Zindagi Na Milegi Dobara led the ceremony with 14 nominations, followed by The Dirty Picture with 10 nominations and Rockstar with 9 nominations.

Zindagi Na Milegi Dobara won 9 awards, including Best Film, Best Director (for Zoya Akhtar) and Best Supporting Actor (for Farhan Akhtar), thus becoming the most-awarded film at the ceremony.

Winners and nominees
Following the IIFA Voting Weekend, which occurred from 31 March – 1 April 2012, the nominees, along with the winners of the technical awards were announced on 4 May 2012 on the IIFA website by Sabbas Joseph, director of Wizcraft International Entertainment.

The winners will be announced during the main awards ceremony on 9 June 2012. The technical awards will be given to their respective winners during the IIFA Rocks on 8 June 2012.

Popular awards

Musical awards

Technical awards

Special awards

Films with multiple nominations and awards

The following eleven films received multiple nominations:
 14 nominations: Zindagi Na Milegi Dobara
 10 nominations: The Dirty Picture
 9 nominations: Rockstar
 7 nominations: Bodyguard
 5 nominations: 7 Khoon Maaf,  Singham and Ra.one
 4 nominations: Tanu Weds Manu
 2 nominations: No One Killed Jessica, Don 2, Force, Ladies vs Ricky Bahl, Saheb, Biwi Aur Gangster and Stanley Ka Dabba

The following films received multiple awards:
 9 awards: Zindagi Na Milegi Dobara
 6 awards: Rockstar
 5 awards: The Dirty Picture
 4 awards: Ra.one

See also
 International Indian Film Academy Awards
 Bollywood
 Cinema of India

References

External links

 IIFA.com Official website
 IIFA Weekend Promotional Website
 indya.com Star Plus – Official  broadcaster of IIFA
 IIFA on BBC Asian Network

2012 Indian film awards
Entertainment events in Singapore
2012 film awards

nl:IIFA-Award
IIFA awards